The 2015 Georgia State sand volleyball team represented Georgia State University during the college sand volleyball season of 2015. The team's head coach was Beth Van Fleet in her second season at GSU. They played their home games at the GSU Sand Volleyball Complex and compete as Division I independents under the AVCA.

2015 Roster

Schedule

|- align="center" bgcolor="#ccffcc"
| March 7 || Mercer || 10 || - || Columbia, SC || 12:30 PM || W 4-1 || 1-0
|- align="center" bgcolor="#ccffcc"
| March 7 || Jacksonville || 10 || - || Columbia, SC || 4:30 PM || W 4-1 || 2-0
|- align="center" bgcolor="#ccffcc"
| March 11 || New Orleans || - || - || Atlanta, GA || 9:00 AM || W 5-0 || 3-0
|- align="center" bgcolor="#ccffcc"
| March 11 || Mercer || - || - || Atlanta, GA || 11:00 AM || W 5-0 || 4-0
|- align="center" bgcolor="#ccffcc"
| March 11 || South Carolina || - || - || Atlanta, GA || 5:00 PM || W 5-0 || 5-0
|- align="center" bgcolor="#ffccc"
| March 14 || Florida International || - || 7 || St. Augustine, FL || 8:30 AM || L 2-3 || 5-1
|- align="center" bgcolor="#ccffcc"
| March 14 || LSU || - || - || St. Augustine, FL || 12:30 PM || W 3-2 || 6-1
|- align="center" bgcolor="#ccffcc"
| March 15 || Florida Atlantic || - || - || St. Augustine, FL || 8:30 AM || W 5-0 || 7-1
|- align="center" bgcolor="#ccffcc"
| March 15 || North Florida || - || - || St. Augustine, FL || 10:30 AM || W 5-0 || 8-1
|- align="center" bgcolor="#ccffcc"
| March 21 || Arizona State || - || - || Columbia, SC || 9:45 AM || W 4-1 || 9-1
|- align="center" bgcolor="#ccffcc"
| March 21 || Tulane || - || - || Columbia, SC || 4:45 PM || W 3-2 || 10-1
|- align="center" bgcolor="#ccffcc"
| March 22 || Florida State || - || 4 || Columbia, SC || 9:45 AM || W 3-2 || 11-1
|- align="center" bgcolor="#ccffcc"
| March 22 || Carson-Newman || - || - || Columbia, SC || 4:45 PM|| W 5-0 || 12-1
|- align="center" bgcolor="#ccffcc"
| March 28 || Mercer || 7 || - || Charleston, SC || 8:00 AM || W 3-2 || 13-1
|- align="center" bgcolor="#ccffcc"
| March 28 || Tulane || 7 || - || Charleston, SC || 12:30 PM || W 5-0 || 14-1
|- align="center" bgcolor="#ccffcc"
| March 29 || Stetson || 7 || - || Charleston, SC || 11:00 AM || W 4-1 || 15-1
|- align="center" bgcolor="#ccffcc"
| March 29 || Jacksonville || 7 || - || Charleston, SC || 2:00 PM || W 4-1 || 16-1
|- align="center" bgcolor="#ccffcc"
| April 3 || ULM || 7 || - || Atlanta, GA || 11:00 AM || W 4-1 || 17-1
|- align="center" bgcolor="#ccffcc"
| April 3 || UAB || 7 || - || Atlanta, GA || 3:00 PM || W  3-2 || 18-1
|- align="center" bgcolor="#ffccc"
| May 1 || Pepperdine Waves || Seed 5 || Seed 4 || Gulf Shores, AL || 10:00 AM || L 0-5 || 18-2
|- align="center" bgcolor="#ffccc"
| May 1 || Stetson || Seed 5 || Seed 8 || Gulf Shores, AL || 3:00 PM || L 2-3 || 18-3
|-

References

External links
 Georgia State University Official website
 Georgia State Panthers Official Athletics website

Georgia State Panthers
Georgia State Panthers women's beach volleyball